Gülperi is a Turkish drama television series, produced by TIMS & B Productions and directed by Metin Balekoğlu, the series is inspired by the 1982 Turkish film Gülsüm Ana, starring Fatma Girik. it was aired for the first time on September 15, 2018 on Show TV, starring Ezgi Gör, Nurgül Yeşilçay, Timuçin Esen, Tarık Papuçcuoğlu, Ece Sükan, Burak Dakak, Aleyna Özgeçen, Emir Özyakışır and Onur Bilge, the last episodes was aired on May 3, 2019.

Plot 
Gülperi receives the news that her husband Eyüp has died on a business trip. From then on, her life will become extremely difficult as she and her three children, Hasan, Bedriye, Can, move into her father-in-law and family's mansion. In that place, her husband's brother is obsessed with her, he tries to abuse her, but she defends herself by hurting him with scissors. For this reason, Gülperi is sentenced to almost two years in prison. When she completes her sentence in prison, she returns to the mansion to recover her children, who left her husband's family in custody. With the help of Kadir Aydin, her lawyer and first love, she will try to regain the love and custody of her children.

Cast

Series overview

References

External links
 

Turkish drama television series
Show TV original programming
2018 Turkish television series debuts
2019 Turkish television series endings
Television series produced in Istanbul
Television shows set in Istanbul
Television series set in the 2010s